Achar/Achari/Achary/Acharya (ஆச்சாரி in tamil.karnataka) Achar/Achari is used for girls Achar/Achari/Achary/Acharya for boys in south India of Karnataka   is a last name used by members of the brahmin community native to the states of Tamil Nadu, Andhra Pradesh and  Karnataka in India.

In Southern India Achary is also a term used to indicate Guru.

See also
Acharya

References

Indian surnames